Hydrotalea sandarakina is a bacterium from the genus of Hydrotalea which has been isolated from water from a hot spring from Azores Islands in Portugal.

References

Chitinophagia
Bacteria described in 2012